This is a list of writings by C. S. Lewis.

Nonfiction 
 The Allegory of Love: A Study in Medieval Tradition (1936)
 Rehabilitations and other essays (1939; two essays not included in Essay Collection [2000])
 The Personal Heresy: A Controversy (with E. M. W. Tillyard, 1939)
 The Problem of Pain (1940)
 The Case for Christianity (1942)
 A Preface to Paradise Lost (1942)
 Broadcast Talks (1942)
 The Abolition of Man (1943)
 Christian Behaviour (1943)
 Beyond Personality (1944)
 The Inner Ring (1944)
 Miracles: A Preliminary Study (1947, revised 1960)
 Arthurian Torso (1948; on Charles Williams's poetry)
 Transposition, and other Addresses (1949)
 Mere Christianity: A Revised and Amplified Edition, with a New Introduction, of the Three Books, Broadcast Talks, Christian Behaviour, and Beyond Personality (1952; based on radio talks of 1941–1944)
 English Literature in the Sixteenth Century Excluding Drama. Oxford University Press. 1954; 1975. ISBN 0-19-881298-1
 Major British Writers, Vol I (1954; contribution on Edmund Spenser)
 Surprised by Joy: The Shape of My Early Life (1955; autobiography)
 Reflections on the Psalms (1958)
 The Four Loves (1960)
 Studies in Words (1960)
 The World's Last Night and Other Essays (1960)
 An Experiment in Criticism (1961)
 A Grief Observed (1961; first published under the pseudonym N. W. Clerk)
 They Asked for a Paper: Papers and Addresses (1962; all essays found in Essay Collection [2000])
 Selections from Layamon's Brut (ed. G L Brook, 1963 Oxford University Press; introduction)

Posthumous publications:
 Letters to Malcolm: Chiefly on Prayer (1964)
 Beyond The Bright Blur (1963) (a limited-run 30-page excerpt taken from Letters to Malcolm and "published as a New Year's greeting to friends of the author", according to the opening page)
 The Discarded Image: An Introduction to Medieval and Renaissance Literature (1964)
 Studies in Medieval and Renaissance Literature (1966; not included in Essay Collection [2000])
 On Stories: and other essays on literature (ed. Walter Hooper, 1966)
 Spenser's Images of Life (ed. Alastair Fowler, 1967)
 Letters to an American Lady (1967)
 Christian Reflections (1967; essays and papers; all essays found in Essay Collection [2000])
 Selected Literary Essays (1969; not included in Essay Collection [2000])
 God in the Dock: Essays on Theology and Ethics (1970)
 Undeceptions (1971; essays; one essay not included in Essay Collection [2000])
 The Weight of Glory and Other Addresses (1980)
 Of Other Worlds (1982; essays; one essay not included in Essay Collection [2000])
 The Business Of Heaven: Daily Readings From C. S. Lewis (Walter Hooper, ed.; 1984)
 Present Concerns (1986; essays; all essays found in Essay Collection [2000])
 All My Road Before Me: The Diary of C. S. Lewis 1922–27 (1993)
 Compelling Reason: Essays on Ethics and Theology (1998)
 The Latin Letters of C.S. Lewis (1999)
 Essay Collection: Literature, Philosophy and Short Stories (2000)
 Essay Collection: Faith, Christianity and the Church (2000)
 Collected Letters, Vol. I: Family Letters 1905–1931 (2000)
 From Narnia to a Space Odyssey : The War of Ideas Between Arthur C. Clarke and C.S. Lewis (2003)
 Collected Letters, Vol. II: Books, Broadcasts and War 1931–1949 (2004)
 Collected Letters, Vol. III: Narnia, Cambridge and Joy 1950–1963 (2007)
 Language and Human Nature with J.R.R. Tolkien (draft discovered in 2009)
 Image and Imagination: Essays and Reviews (2013)

Fiction 
 The Pilgrim's Regress (1933)
 Space Trilogy
 Out of the Silent Planet (1938)
 Perelandra (aka Voyage to Venus) (1943)
 That Hideous Strength (1945)
 The Screwtape Letters (1942)
 The Great Divorce (1945)
 The Chronicles of Narnia
 The Lion, the Witch and the Wardrobe (1950)
 Prince Caspian (1951)
 The Voyage of the Dawn Treader (1952)
 The Silver Chair (1953)
 The Horse and His Boy (1954)
 The Magician's Nephew (1955)
 The Last Battle (1956)
 Till We Have Faces (1956)
 The Shoddy Lands (short story, Fantasy and Science Fiction, February 1956)
 Ministering Angels (short story, Fantasy and Science Fiction, January 1958)
 Screwtape Proposes a Toast (1961) (an addition to The Screwtape Letters)
 The Dark Tower  (1977)
 Boxen: The Imaginary World of the Young C. S. Lewis (ed. Walter Hooper, 1985)

Poetry 
 Spirits in Bondage (1919; published under pseudonym Clive Hamilton)
 Dymer (1926; published under pseudonym Clive Hamilton)
 The End of the Wine (published in Punch, 3 Dec 1947; reprinted in The Magazine of Fantasy and Science Fiction July 1964)
 Poems (ed. Walter Hooper, 1964, a collection of Lewis poems not included in Dymer or Spirits in Bondage)
 Narrative Poems (ed. Walter Hooper, 1969; includes Dymer, Launcelot, The Nameless Isle, and The Queen of Drum.
 The Collected Poems of C. S. Lewis (ed. Walter Hooper, 1994; expanded edition of the 1964 Poems book; includes Spirits in Bondage)
 C.S. Lewis's Lost Aeneid: Arms and Exile (ed. A.T. Reyes, 2011; includes the surviving fragments of Lewis's translation of Virgil's Aeneid, presented in parallel with the Latin text, and accompanied by synopses of missing sections)
 The Collected Poems of C. S. Lewis: A Critical Edition (edited by Don W. King, 2015; Kent State University Press)

As editor 
 George MacDonald: An Anthology (1947)
 Essays Presented to Charles Williams (1947)

References

Further reading 
 John Beversluis, C. S. Lewis and the Search for Rational Religion. Eerdmans, 1985. 
 Ronald W. Bresland. The Backward Glance: C.S. Lewis and Ireland. Belfast: Institute of Irish Studies at Queen's University of Belfast, 1999.
 Brown, Devin. Bringing Narnia Home; Lessons from the Other Side of the Wardrobe (2015; Abingdon Press)
 Brown, Devin. Discussing Mere Christianity (2015; Zondervan)
 Brown, Devin. A Life Observed; A Spiritual Biography of C. S. Lewis. (2013; Brazos Press)
 Humphrey Carpenter, The Inklings: C. S. Lewis, J. R. R. Tolkien, Charles Williams and their friends. George Allen & Unwin, 1978. 
 Joe R. Christopher, C. S. Lewis.  Twayne Publishers, 1987.  
 Joe R. Christopher & Joan K. Ostling, C. S. Lewis: An Annotated Checklist of Writings a;bout him and his Works. Kent State University Press, n.d. (1972). 
 .
 James Como, Branches to Heaven: The Geniuses of C. S. Lewis, Spence, 1998.
 “A Note on C. S. Lewis’s The Screwtape Letters.” The Anglican Digest 49, no. 2 (2007): 55–58.
 James Como, Remembering C. S. Lewis (3rd ed. of C. S. Lewis at the Breakfast Table). Ignatius, 2006
 Sean Connolly, Inklings of Heaven: C. S. Lewis and Eschatology, Gracewing, 2007. 
 Michael Coren, The Man Who Created Narnia: The Story of C. S. Lewis. Eerdmans Pub Co, Reprint edition 1996. 
 
 David C. Downing, Into the Region of Awe: Mysticism in C. S. Lewis. InterVarsity, 2005. 
 David C. Downing, Into the Wardrobe: C. S. Lewis and the Narnia Chronicles. Jossey-Bass, 2005. 
 David C. Downing, The Most Reluctant Convert: C. S. Lewis's Journey to Faith. InterVarsity, 2002. 
 David C. Downing, Planets in Peril: A Critical Study of C. S. Lewis's Ransom Trilogy. University of Massachusetts Press, 1992. 
 Colin Duriez and David Porter, The Inklings Handbook: The Lives, Thought and Writings of C. S. Lewis, J. R. R. Tolkien, Charles Williams, Owen Barfield, and Their Friends. 2001, 
 Colin Duriez, Tolkien and C. S. Lewis: The Gift of Friendship. Paulist Press, 2003. 
 .
 .
 .
 Bruce L. Edwards, Editor. The Taste of the Pineapple: Essays on C. S. Lewis as Reader, Critic, and Imaginative Writer. The Popular Press, 1988. 
 Bruce L. Edwards, A Rhetoric of Reading: C. S. Lewis's Defense of Western Literacy. Center for the Study of Christian Values in Literature, 1986. 
 Alastair Fowler, 'C. S. Lewis: Supervisor', Yale Review, Vol. 91, No. 4 (October 2003).
 Jocelyn Gibb (ed.), Light on C. S. Lewis. Geoffrey Bles, 1965 & Harcourt Brace Jovanovich 1976. 
 Douglas Gilbert & Clyde Kilby, C. S. Lewis: Images of His World. Eerdmans, 1973 & 2005. 
 .
 David Graham (ed.), We Remember C. S. Lewis. Broadman & Holman Publishers, 2001. 
 Roger Lancelyn Green & Walter Hooper, C. S. Lewis: A Biography. Fully revised & expanded edition. HarperCollins, 2002. 
 Douglas Gresham, Jack's Life: A Memory of C. S. Lewis. Broadman & Holman Publishers, 2005. 
 .
 William Griffin, C. S. Lewis: The Authentic Voice. (Formerly C. S. Lewis: A Dramatic Life) Lion, 2005. 
 Joel D. Heck, Irrigating Deserts: C. S. Lewis on Education. Concordia Publishing House, 2006. 
 Edward Henderson (ed.), C. S. Lewis and Friends: Faith and the Power of Imagination. London: SPCK; Eugene, Ore.: Cascade, 2011.
 Walter Hooper, C. S. Lewis: A Companion and Guide. HarperCollins, 1996. 
 Walter Hooper, Through Joy and Beyond: A Pictorial Biography of C. S. Lewis. Macmillan, 1982. 
 .
 Carolyn Keefe, C. S. Lewis: Speaker & Teacher. Zondervan, 1979. 
 Jon Kennedy, The Everything Guide to C.S. Lewis and Narnia. Adams Media, 2008. 
 Clyde S. Kilby, The Christian World of C. S. Lewis. Eerdmans, 1964, 1995. 
 W.H. Lewis (ed), Letters of C. S. Lewis. Geoffrey Bles, 1966. 
 Kathryn Lindskoog, Light in the Shadowlands: Protecting the Real C. S. Lewis. Multnomah Pub., 1994. 
 Susan Lowenberg, C. S. Lewis: A Reference Guide 1972–1988. Hall & Co., 1993. 
 Wayne Mardindale & Jerry Root, The Quotable Lewis. Tyndale House Publishers, 1990. 
 Alister McGrath, C.S. Lewis – Eccentric Genius; Reluctant Prophet. Tyndale House Publishers, Inc., 2013. .
 Alister McGrath, The Intellectual World of C.S. Lewis. Wiley-Blackwell, 2014 
 David Mills (editor) (ed), The Pilgrim's Guide: C. S. Lewis and the Art of Witness. Eerdmans, 1998. 
 Mueller, Steven P., Not a Tame God: Christ in the Writings of C. S. Lewis. Concordia Publishing House, Saint Louis, Mo., 2002. 
 Markus Mühling, A Theological Journey into Narnia.  An Analysis of the Message beneath the Text, Vandenhoeck & Ruprecht, Göttingen 2005, 
 Joseph Pearce, C. S. Lewis and the Catholic Church. Ignatius Press, 2003. 
 Thomas C. Peters, Simply C. S. Lewis. A Beginner's Guide to His Life and Works. Kingsway Publications, 1998. 
 Justin Phillips, C. S. Lewis at the BBC: Messages of Hope in the Darkness of War. Marshall Pickering, 2003. 
 Victor Reppert, C. S. Lewis's Dangerous Idea: In Defense of the Argument from Reason. InterVarsity Press, 2003. 
 George Sayer, Jack: C. S. Lewis and His Times. Macmillan, 1988. 
 Peter J. Schakel, Imagination and the Arts in C. S. Lewis: Journeying to Narnia and Other Worlds. University of Missouri Press, 2002. 
 
 Peter J. Schakel, ed. The Longing for a Form: Essays on the Fiction of C. S. Lewis. Kent State University Press, 1977. 
 Peter J. Schakel and Charles A. Huttar, ed. Word and Story in C. S. Lewis. University of Missouri Press, 1991. 
 Stephen Schofield. In Search of C. S. Lewis. Bridge Logos Pub. 1983. 
 Jeffrey D. Schultz and John G. West, Jr. (eds.), The C. S. Lewis Readers' Encyclopedia. Zondervan, 1998. 
 G. B. Tennyson (ed.), Owen Barfield on C. S. Lewis. Wesleyan University Press, 1989. .
 Richard J. Wagner. C. S. Lewis and Narnia for Dummies. For Dummies, 2005. 
 .
 Chad Walsh, C. S. Lewis: Apostle to the Skeptics. Macmillan, 1949.
 Chad Walsh, The Literary Legacy of C. S. Lewis. Harcourt Brace Jovanovich, 1979. .
 Michael Ward, Planet Narnia, Oxford University Press, 2008. .
 George Watson (ed.), Critical Essays on C. S. Lewis. Scolar Press, 1992. 
 Michael White, C. S. Lewis: The Boy Who Chronicled Narnia. Abacus, 2005. 
 Erik J. Wielenberg, God and the Reach of Reason. Cambridge University Press, 2007. 
 A. N. Wilson, C. S. Lewis: A Biography. W. W. Norton, 1990.

External links
 

 
Bibliographies by writer
Bibliographies of British writers
Christian bibliographies
Bibliography
Bibliographies of Irish writers